Oroperipatus belli is a species of velvet worm in the Peripatidae family. The female of this species has 28 pairs of legs; the male has 25 pairs. The type locality is in Ecuador.

References

Onychophorans of tropical America
Onychophoran species
Animals described in 1904